The Digital Chart of the World (DCW) is a comprehensive digital map of Earth.  It is the most comprehensive geographical information system (GIS) global database that is freely available as of 2006, although it has not been updated since 1992.

Origin 
The primary source for this database is the United States Defense Mapping Agency's (DMA) operational navigation chart (ONC) 1:1,000,000 scale paper map series produced by the US, Australia, Canada, and the United Kingdom. These charts were designed to meet the needs of pilots and air crews in medium-and low-altitude en route navigation and to support military operational planning, intelligence briefings, and other needs.

Data structure 
The data is divided into 2,094 tiles that represent 5 × 5-degree areas of the globe, except data obtained from Penn State which is broken up by pre-1992 national boundaries, and data from the National Imagery and Mapping Agency (NIMA) which is broken into just five tiles.  The data currency varies from place to place, ranging from the mid-1960s to the early 1990s.

The thematic layers of the Digital Chart of the World are:
 Political/ocean (country boundaries)
 Populated places (urbanized areas and points)
 Roads
 Railroads
 Aeronautical structures
 Utilities (electrical, telephone, pipelines)
 Drainage system
 Hypsographic data
 Land cover
 Ocean features
 Physiography
 Cultural landmarks
 Transportation structure
 Vegetation
 Data location

See also 
 Vector map (VMAP0 and VMAP1 data)
 Digital elevation model
 Digital terrain model

External links 
 Digital Chart of the World specification (PDF)
 Digital Chart of the World Data Quality Project
 Digital Chart of the World (Countries) at WorldMap, Harvard University

Geographic information systems
World maps